Por Amarte Tanto is a Venezuelan telenovela written by Vivel Nouel and produced by Venevisión in 1993. This telenovela lasted 146 episodes and was distributed internationally by Venevisión International.

Viviana Gibelli and Jean Carlo Simancas starred as the main protagonists with Carolina Cristancho and Raúl Amundaray as the main antagonists.

Plot
Laura Vasquez has never been happy. Heiress to billionaire Gregorio Velasquez, her fortune has only caused her pain. Noble and shy, she constantly searches for a love pure and sincere. Luciana, who lives in the Vasquez mansion, has raised Laura. She has tried to be a mother to Laura, but she has never been able to erase the memory of her beautiful and elegant mother, Amanda Vasquez. Gregorio Vasquez owns an advertising agency where Luis Arturo Ramirez works as an account executive. Luis Arturo is an attractive young man who is always looking for an easy way out. He seeks financial security through women and his dream is to find a rich, single and beautiful heiress. He meets Laura and, from that moment on, he decides to win her heart. He also meets Damiana, a woman without any scruples, who happens to be Laura's cousin. His passion for Damiana will drive him into a tempestuous love triangle.

Cast
 Jean Carlo Simancas as Luis Arturo Ramírez
 Viviana Gibelli as Laura Velásquez
 Javier Vidal as Javier
 Carolina Cristancho as Damiana
 Raúl Amundaray as Gregorio Vasquez
 Francisco Ferrari as Piero Grisanti
 Juan Carlos Vivas as Honorio

References

External links
 
 Opening Credits

1993 telenovelas
Venevisión telenovelas
Venezuelan telenovelas
1993 Venezuelan television series debuts
1993 Venezuelan television series endings
Spanish-language telenovelas
Television shows set in Venezuela